Suite No. 1 in G Minor (or Fantaisie-tableaux), Op. 5, is a suite for two pianos written by Sergei Rachmaninoff. The suite was a musical depiction of four poems written in the summer of 1893 at the Lysikof estate in Lebeden, Kharkov. The work was dedicated to Tchaikovsky, as he was one of Rachmaninoff's greatest inspirations and proponents. The premiere took place on November 30, 1893, having been played by Rachmaninoff himself and Pavel Pabst in Moscow, with Tchaikovsky having died a month prior. Its four movements alongside their respective poems (as abridged on the original published score , translated to English) are as follows:
Barcarolle. Allegretto, in G minor.
At dusk the chill wave laps gently
Beneath the gondola’s slow oar
That song again and again, the twang of the guitar,
In the distance the old barcarolle was heard,
now melancholy, now happy…
The gondola glides through the water, and time glides over the surge of love;
The water will grow smooth again and passion will rise no more.
(Mikhail Lermontov)La nuit... L'amour... Adagio sostenuto, in D major. (The night...the love...)
It is the hour when from the boughs
The nightingale’s high note is heard,
It is the hour when lovers’ vows
Seem sweet in every whisper’d word,
And gentle winds and waters near,
Make music to the lonely ear.....
(Lord Byron)Les Larmes. Largo di molto, in G minor. (The Tears) 
Tears, human tears
You flow both early and late —
You flow unknown, you flow unseen
Inexhaustible, innumerable —
You flow like torrents of rain
In the depths of an autumn night.
(Fyodor Tyutchev)Pâques. Allegro maestoso, in G minor. (Easter)
Across the earth a mighty bell is ringing
Until all the booming air rocks like the sea
As silver thunderings sing forth the tidings
Exulting in that holy victory…
(Aleksey Khomyakov)

Rachmaninoff composed a second suite for two pianos in 1901.
The Suite No. 1 was arranged for piano and orchestra by Rebekah Harkness.  A 1968 recording by Jorge Mester and the London Philharmonic Orchestra was released in 1994 on Citadel Records.

References

External links

Piano music by Sergei Rachmaninoff
Compositions for two pianos
Suites (music)
1893 compositions
Rachmaninoff
Chamber music by Sergei Rachmaninoff